Manaoag, officially the Municipality of Manaoag, is a 1st class municipality in the province of Pangasinan, Philippines. According to the 2020 census, it has a population of 76,045 people.

Etymology
Manaoag came from the Pangasinan word "Mantaoag" which means "to call".

History
Manaoag as a settlement was used to be part of present-day San Jacinto in the early 1600s. Later, the Augustinians established a mission as Mission of Sta. Monica, while Dominicans also served the area.

In 1972, Republic Act No. 6485 was issued wherein twenty barrios were organized as a separate municipality and the province's newest, named Laoac; however, it took long before the establishment was formalized in 1980.

Geography
Manaoag is bordered by Pozorrubio in the north, Urdaneta City and Mapandan in the south, Laoac in the east, and San Jacinto in the west.

Barangays
Manaoag is politically subdivided into 26 barangays. These barangays are headed by elected officials: Barangay Captain, Barangay Council, whose members are called Barangay Councilors. All are elected every three years.

Climate

Demographics

Economy

Government
Manaoag, belonging to the fourth congressional district of the province of Pangasinan, is governed by a mayor designated as its local chief executive and by a municipal council as its legislative body in accordance with the Local Government Code. The mayor, vice mayor, and the councilors are elected directly by the people through an election which is being held every three years.

Elected officials

Culture

Our Lady of Manaoag

The town is a popular local pilgrimage site as it enshrines a 17th-century ivory statue of St Mary under the title of Nuestra Señora del Rosario de Manaoag ("Our Lady of the Rosary of Manaoag"). Legend has it that an unnamed man had a vision of the Blessed Virgin Mary, who told him to have the shrine built. Famous souvenirs include candles, rosaries, and ampullae of blessed oil with flowers (which supposedly has healing properties), as well as less religious ones such as bagoóng monamon and tupig.

List of Cultural Properties of Manaoag

|}

Gallery

References

External links

 Manaoag Profile at PhilAtlas.com
 Municipal Profile at the National Competitiveness Council of the Philippines
 Manaoag at the Pangasinan Government Website
 Local Governance Performance Management System
 [ Philippine Standard Geographic Code]
 Philippine Census Information
 Our Lady of Manaoag
 Manaoag Shrine

Municipalities of Pangasinan
Catholic pilgrimage sites